The Mystery of the Vanished Prince, published 1951, is the ninth novel in the Five Find-Outers series written by Enid Blyton.

Plot summary
Fatty has returned to Peterswood village from a cruise holiday with Moroccan costumes for his friends Larry, Daisy, Pip and Bets. The four try on the exotic garb, at which point they receive an unannounced visit from Ern Goon, accompanied by his brothers, twins Sid and Perce. Fatty tricks Ern into believing the disguised children are actually relatives and friends of Prince Bongawah, a foreign royal who is purportedly at a summer camp alongside a caravan site where the three Goon brothers are camping. Notably, Bets claims to be the prince's sister, Princess Bongawee. The children take a walk, whereupon they encounter Ern's uncle, the village policeman Mr Goon, who is also duped into believing the disguised children are foreigners.

Later, Prince Bongawah is reported to have disappeared. Goon informs the district's senior police officer, Inspector Jenks, he has met with the prince's relatives, including Princess Bongawee. Realizing the children's deception could jeopardize the police investigation, Fatty tells Goon the foreign party was not real. He also advises Inspector Jenks of the ruse, earning a stern reprimand. Fatty then resolves to share information on the case with Goon.

Sid, whose verbal communication is hampered by a proclivity for toffees that stick his teeth together, manages to tell Fatty he saw the vanished prince hiding in the base of a large double-pram, used by a woman for her twin babies at a caravan next to boys' campsite. The Find-Outers then try to track down the woman. Fatty, disguised as a peddler, befriends the woman's son, Rollo, who reveals the real prince was kidnapped before arriving at the camp. Rollo, who had been posing as the prince, also divulges the likely location of the captive as Raylingham Marshes. Fatty passes on this information to Mr Goon, who takes a late-night train to the area.

The following day, the Find-Outers and Ern also go the marshes, but they are captured and locked inside a farmhouse. As a helicopter arrives to take away the prince, Fatty manages to telephone Inspector Jenks and then locates the prince, but the children are unable to escape until the police arrive and arrest the crooks. Mr Goon is subsequently found, furious and disheveled, locked in a shed. Fatty releases him, sympathizes with his misfortune and kindly praises him in front of the inspector.

Characters
As with all books in the Find-Outers Mystery series, the protagonists are Frederick Algernon Trotteville, familiarly known as Fatty; siblings Philip (Pip) and Elizabeth (Bets) Hilton; and siblings Laurence (Larry) and Margaret (Daisy) Daykin; as well as Fatty's dog, Buster. The incompetent and irascible village policeman, Mr Goon, also appears in all of the books, as does his superior Inspector Jenks (who is promoted to Chief Inspector and Superintendent). This book also features Mr Goon's nephew, Ern, and Ern's younger twin brothers, Sid and Perce.

External links

Enid Blyton Society page

Novels by Enid Blyton
1951 British novels
Methuen Publishing books
1951 children's books